The Joint by Cannabis is a recreational marijuana dispensary that is located in the U.S. state of Colorado in the city of Denver.

See also
 Cannabis in Colorado

References

Cannabis in Colorado
Cannabis dispensaries in the United States